Philippine Science High School-Western Visayas Campus: Thirty Years After…

by: Carlito A. Cerbo, Jr (Faculty, Social Science Unit)

 

Philippine Science High School-Western Visayas Campus (PSHS-WVC) was created following the mandate set by the Executive Order No. 1090 signed by Pres. Ferdinand E. Marcos on 5 February 1986. Together with the Philippine Science High School-Mindanao Campus (PSHS-MC), they were established to cater to the needs of the students gifted in science, math and technology in the Visayas and Mindanao regions of the country. With the first Philippine Science High School established in Diliman, Quezon City in 1964 under the Republic Act No. 3661, known as the PSHS Charter, the construction of these two campuses in Visayas and Mindanao would provide “accessibility to talented young students” who could not afford to study in Manila “due to economic and social reasons” in order to “become a motivating influence for the pursuit of academic excellence in all levels of the educational system in the region” (E.O. No. 1090). Section 1 of the said order specifies two regional campuses of PSHS, Mindanao campus in Davao City and another in Iloilo City to be known as the Philippine Science High School-Visayas Campus (PSHSVC). It further orders the operation of these two campuses immediately, for Davao City, not later than the school year 1986-87 and for Iloilo City, not later than the school year 1987-88. PSHS-Mindanao Campus formally began its operation in 1988 while the Iloilo City campus was stalled as the country experienced political turmoil leading to EDSA Revolution on February 22-25, 1986.

The campus was once the only concrete structure amidst acres of rice fields, whereas now, it is in a sprawling upper class subdivision.

History
The first Philippine Science High School was established in Diliman, Quezon City under Republic Act No. 3661, known as the PSHS Charter. The school opened on 5 September 1964 at a rented building owned by the Philippine Government Employees Association along Elliptical Road, Diliman, Quezon City. It was only in 1970 that the school moved to its present campus along Agham Road, Diliman, Quezon City.

To expand the opportunities of students gifted in science, mathematics and technology in the Visayas and Mindanao, the PSHS Mindanao Campus and the PSHS Western Visayas Campus were created through Executive Order No. 1090 on 5 February 1986. The then PSHS Mindanao Campus was established in Davao City and started its operation in 1988.

On 21 August 1991, Secretary of Department of Science and Technology Ceferino L. Follosco (representing the donee), Ms. Nenita Kabayao Mapua and Ms. Makiling Ascalon (representing the donor), signed the deed of donation of the 3.4 Hectare lot in Bito-on, Jaro, Iloilo City. The campus will be known as the Doña Lawa-an H. Lopez Campus. Construction of the PSHSWV started in February 1992, followed by the formal ground breaking ceremony in May of the same year.

PSHS-WV formally started its operations on 1 July 1993. The 47 pioneer scholars held classes at the University of the Philippines in the Visayas since the school campus was still under construction. The temporary dormitory was located in Leganes, Iloilo which is approximately 13 kilometers away from UPV. Prof. Gilma T. Tayo served as the first campus director. It was in school year 1994-1995 that school operations transferred to its present location in Bito-on, Jaro, Iloilo City. Dr. Diana S. Aure was then the campus director. The PSHS-WV was formally inaugurated on 13 June 1997 by President Fidel V. Ramos.

The pioneer batch, all 47 of them, graduated from PSHS-WV on 31 March 1997. In the same year, the PSHS System Law (R.A. 8496) was signed by President Fidel V. Ramos. It established the PSHS System and unified all the existing campuses into a single system of governance and management.

In 2001, the PSHS System Law was further amended by R.A. No. 9036 consolidating the power and authority over all PSHS System campuses into a single Board of Trustees to ensure uniform policy coordination, standards and management.

Aside from the present campus, a four-hectare research station was donated by the family of the late Vice-Governor Guardilino Mosqueda in Balcon Maravilla, Jordan, Guimaras. It is known as the Mosqueda Campus of the PSHS-WV. Another 1 hectare coastal lot was donated by Engr. Jose Abad in Morubauan, Guimaras. It shall be the site of the Research Station in Marine Biology.

In 2011, the 5th campus director, Dr. Josette T. Biyo was elevated as the Executive Director of the Philippine Science High School System. Dr. Edgar Almero was appointed as the Officer-in-Charge in the interim. As of 1 April 2012, Ms. Shena Faith M. Ganela, succeeded Dr. Josette T. Biyo as the Campus Director. She is the 6th Director of the campus.

Admission and Academic Program
Admission to the PSHS System is through the PSHS System National Competitive Examination (PSHS-NCE). The screening consists of tests in Verbal, Abstract Reasoning, Science and Mathematics. To be eligible for admission, applicants must be Filipino students who must belong to the top 10% of the graduating class or must have special aptitude in science and math. The top 90 scholars from the region are admitted as scholars.

In the sciences, the scholars learn Biology, Chemistry and Physics as separate subjects starting the second year. Computer Science is also offered in all year levels.

The mathematics department offers subjects in Elementary Algebra, Advanced Algebra, Plane Geometry, Trigonometry, Selected Topics in Number Theory, Statistics and Elementary Analysis among others.

Four years of studies in English, Filipino, and the Social Science are part of the Humanities curriculum. Health and Physical Education subjects are also given to enhance the physical well being of the students. Activities include gymnastics, soccer, basketball, volleyball, softball, bowling and folk and social dances.

Faculty
The PSHSWV Faculty includes educators with specialization in science and technology, most of whom with advanced degrees in their respective fields. The faculty is headed by the Curriculum and Instruction Services Division Chief. Mr. Rolando Libutaque is the current CISD chief.

Three of the teachers were awarded as Outstanding Teachers of the Philippines by the Metrobank Foundation: former campus director Dr. Josette Biyo was awarded in 1997, Dr. Shena Faith Ganela, the present Campus Director, was honored in 2009, and Dr. Myrna Libutaque was awarded in 2015.

References

External links
PSHS Western Visayas Campus official website

Philippine Science High School System
Schools in Iloilo City
High schools in Iloilo